Dorukhan Toköz (born 21 May 1996) is a Turkish professional footballer who plays as a midfielder and defender for Trabzonspor.

Professional career
Dorukhan made his professional debut for Eskişehirspor in a 2-1 Süper Lig loss to İstanbul Başakşehir F.K. on 20 December 2015.

International career
Dorukhan was a youth international player for the Turkey U21s.

He made his debut for the Turkey national football team on 22 March 2019 in a Euro 2020 qualifier against Albania, as a 65th-minute substitute for Emre Belözoğlu.

International goals
Scores and results list. Turkey's goal tally first.

Honours

Club
Beşiktaş J.K.
Süper Lig: 2020–21
Türkiye Kupası: 2020–21

Trabzonspor
Süper Lig: 2021–22
Turkish Super Cup: 2022

Individual
Süper Lig Breakthrough of the Year: 2018–19

References

External links
 
 
 
 
 

1996 births
Living people
Sportspeople from Eskişehir
Turkish footballers
Turkey under-21 international footballers
Turkey international footballers
Eskişehirspor footballers
Beşiktaş J.K. footballers
Trabzonspor footballers
Süper Lig players
TFF First League players
Association football midfielders
UEFA Euro 2020 players